Żbikowski or Zbikowski (feminine: Żbikowska, plural: Żbikowscy) is a Polish family name, derived from the word żbik, meaning wildcat. 

The surname may refer to:

Mark Zbikowski (born 1956), Microsoft architect
Tadeusz Żbikowski (1930-1989), Polish sinologist
Tom Zbikowski (born 1985), American football player
Fred Zbikowski, the birth name of Fred Shields (soccer player)
Fred Zbikowski (military), commander of the Western Rifle Division in the Russian Civil War
Beata Żbikowska, Polish Olympic athlete (summer 1960)

See also
 Żbik (disambiguation)

Polish-language surnames